Giselle Marie Bissot Kieswetter (born 18 December 1982, in Panama City, Panama) is a Panamanian model and beauty pageant contestant winner of the Miss Panama World 2006 title on 15 July 2006 for Miss World 2006 contest.

Participation in contests
In 1998 it took part Chica & Chico Modelo. In 2003 stayed of the first finalist in Señorita Panamá. In 2005 it went to Miss Asia Pacificic International in China, Also it took part in the Miss Mesoamérica, which was realized in Houston, where it occupied the fourth place.

Miss Panamá World 2006

At the end of the Señorita Panamá 2006 she also received awards including Best Hair, Miss Camel Toe, Miss Bikini Shop.

Bissot is 5 ft 8 in (1.73 m) tall, and competed in the national beauty pageant Señorita Panamá 2006. She represented the state of Panamá Centro .

Miss World 2006 

She represented Panama in the 56th edition of the Miss World 2006 pageant, was held at the Palace of Culture and Science in, Warsaw, Poland on September 30, 2006. She was Top 25 Beach Beauty.

See also
 Señorita Panamá 2006

References

External links
Panamá 2006 official website
Miss Panamá

1982 births
Living people
Panamanian beauty pageant winners
Panamanian female models
Miss World 2006 delegates
Señorita Panamá